Maks Gregorič (born 26 August 1985) is a Slovenian  motorcycle speedway rider who is a member of Slovenian national team at 2009 Speedway World Cup and is  riding for the Kolejarz Rawicz in the Polish Second League.

Career details

World championships 
 Team World Championship (Speedway World Team Cup and Speedway World Cup)
 2006 - 2nd place in Qualifying round 2
 2007 - 4th place in Qualifying round 1
 2008 - 3rd place in Qualifying Round 2
 2009 - in team squad (on 13 July)
 Team U-21 World Championship (U-21 Speedway World Cup)
 2005 - 4th place in Qualifying Round 1 for Hungarian-Slovenian join team

European championships 
 Individual European Championship
 2008 - 15th place in Semi-Final 1
 2009 - track reserve at Semi-Final 3 (on 25 July)
 European Pairs Championship
 2008 - 5th place in Semi-Final 1
 2009 -  Miskolc - the Final will be on 26 September
 European Club Champions' Cup
 2006 - 3rd place in Semi-Final 1 for Ljubljana
 2007 - 3rd place in Semi-Final 1 for Ljubljana

See also 
 Slovenia national speedway team
 List of Speedway Grand Prix riders

References 

Slovenian speedway riders
1985 births
Living people
Sportspeople from Ljubljana